Acrocercops retrogressa is a moth of the family Gracillariidae. It is known from Queensland and South Australia.

References

retrogressa
Moths of Australia
Moths described in 1921